The Sakishima green snake (Ptyas herminae) is a species of snake in the family Colubridae. The species is endemic to the Yaeyama Islands in the southern Ryukyu Islands of Japan.

Etymology
The specific name, herminae, is in honor of Boettger's wife, Hermine Boettger.

Geographic range
P. herminae is found in the Yaeyama Islands of Japan.

Habitat
The preferred natural habitat of P. herminae is forest.

Description

Behavior
P. herminae is terrestrial.

Diet
P. herminae preys upon earthworms.

Reproduction
P. herminae is oviparous. An adult female may lay a clutch of about eight eggs in August, which is later than other species of terrestrial snakes lay eggs in the Ryukyus.

References

Further reading
Boettger O (1895). "Neue Frösche und Schlangen von den Liukiu-Inseln ". Zoologischer Anzeiger 18: 266–270. (Ablabes herminae, new species, p. 269). (in German).
Boulenger GA (1896). Catalogue of the Snakes in the British Museum (Natural History). Volume III., Containing the Colubridæ (Opisthoglyphæ and Proteroglyphæ) ... London: Trustees of the British Museum (Natural History). (Taylor and Francis, printers). xiv + 727 pp. + Plates IXXV. ("Ablabes herminæ", p. 643).
Figueroa A, McKelvy AD, Grismer LL, Bell CD, Lailvaux SP (2016). "A Species-Level Phylogeny of Extant Snakes with Description of a new Colubrid Subfamily and Genus". PLoS ONE 11 (9): e0161070. (Ptyas herminae, new combination).
Goris, Richard C; Maeda, Norio (2004). Guide to the Amphibians and Reptiles of Japan. Malabar, Florida: Krieger Publishing Company. 285 pp. .
Stejneger L (1907). Herpetology of Japan and Adjacent Territory. United States National Museum Bulletin 58. Washington, District of Columbia: Smithsonian Institution. xx + 577 pp. (Liopeltis herminæ, new combination, pp. 343–344, Figures 296–297).

Colubrids
Endemic reptiles of Japan
Endemic fauna of the Ryukyu Islands
Taxa named by Oskar Boettger
Reptiles described in 1895
Taxonomy articles created by Polbot